Industrial Relations Commissions are government courts or tribunal set up by a state or country to regulate and adjudicate on employment and industrial issues between employees and employers.  These bodies are predominantly found in Australia where bodies in each of the states of that nation were set up from the early 1900s to deal with industrial issues.  

The bodies are an attempt to mitigate the effects of the common law on employment contracts between employers and employees.

Australia

At the national level, the Australian Government has set up the Australian Industrial Relations Commission to deal with these issues, although recent legislative changes under WorkChoices will see the influence of that tribunal diminish.

In New South Wales, the state government has set up the Industrial Relations Commission of New South Wales.

In Victoria, the previous Liberal Party of Australia referred industrial issues to the national government, and industrial issues are dealt with by the AIRC.

In Western Australia, the state government has set up the Western Australia Industrial Relations Commission.

In South Australia, the state government has set up the Industrial Relations Court of South Australia.

United States
A reference to such a commission in the United States may be a reference to the Industrial Commission.

References

Industrial Relations Acts of NSW, WA and SA.

Courts by type